Rowing is an Universiade optional sport since the 1987 in Zagreb, Yugoslavia. After this, rowing was an optional sport at the 1989, 1993, 2013 and 2015 editions. The sport will return on a same status, at the 2021 Summer Universiade, to be held in Chengdu, People's Republic of China.

Editions

Medal table 
Last updated after the 2015 Summer Universiade

References 
Sports123
Chengdu to be named as 2021 Summer Universiade Host

 
Sports at the Summer Universiade
Universiade